John Kerr (1778–1823) was an Irish-born mayor of Columbus, Ohio in the United States. He was the second mayor of the capital city and served Columbus for over two terms. His successor was Eli C. King. He was buried in the North Graveyard.

References

Bibliography

External links
John Kerr at Political Graveyard

Mayors of Columbus, Ohio
1778 births
1823 deaths
Irish emigrants to the United States (before 1923)